Robin Hood: Prince of Thieves is a console game released in 1991 for the Nintendo Entertainment System and Game Boy developed by Sculptured Software, Inc. and Bits Studios, respectively, and published by Virgin Games, Inc. It was based on the film of the same name.

The game was featured as the cover game for the July 1991 issue of Nintendo Power magazine. However, this issue was notorious for the fact that the game was not released until 4 months after the issue was released.

Gameplay 
The game was notable for featuring several modes of gameplay. The standard adventuring mode depicted the action from an overhead perspective as the player guided Robin through the environment, battling enemies. A second mode used for one-on-one duels depicted the action from the side and featured different controls that allowed the player-controlled character to jump as well as attack and guard. The third mode, a melee mode, featured action taking place from an extreme overhead perspective, allowing for the depiction of large-scale battles between large forces. This mode typically ensued when a large number of Robin's merry men and enemy soldiers clashed.  During a horse racing sequence, there is yet another mode, a blend of the overhead and side perspectives, as the horse must be guided to jump over debris and ultimately beat the competitor.

The game also had a loose equipping system, where nearly any object could be held as a weapon.  When Duncan first joins Robin's band, he comes brandishing a chicken leg for attack.

Story 
The game opens in an Arab prison in Jerusalem. Robin Hood is in prison along with Peter Dubois and Azeem. Robin must free both of them and then they must make their escape. Peter is mortally wounded in the escape process, but Robin and Azeem escape to England.

Upon arrival in England, Robin finds that his father has been murdered and that the Sheriff of Nottingham is ruling England oppressively in the absence of King Richard. Maid Marian tells Robin that there are rumours that men are hiding out in Sherwood Forest from the sheriff and tells him to go there, seek them out and join them.

Once Robin joins the camp in Sherwood, it becomes Robin Hood's home base for the remainder of the game. He continually leaves camp to undertake various missions. Upon completing each mission, Robin must return to camp to find out what mission to undertake next. Eventually, Robin Hood takes his last mission to get rid of the Sheriff of Nottingham. Once Robin defeats the Sheriff, the game is won and concludes with a wedding of Robin Hood and Maid Marian, which is interrupted by King Richard, who has just returned to England. Richard gives Marian away and she and Robin are married.

Reception 

Power Unlimited gave the Game Boy version a score of 83% commenting: "Robin Hood: Prince of Thieves is, of course, based on the movie, but not as bad as many other such games. On the contrary: it is very exciting and adventurous! It is a pity that the figures in the game do not look very nice."

References

External links

1991 video games
Bits Studios games
Nintendo Entertainment System games
Game Boy games
Prince of Thieves
Video games based on films
Video games based on adaptations
Video games scored by David Whittaker
Video games developed in the United States
Video games set in England
Video games set in Jerusalem
Video games set in the Middle Ages
Virgin Interactive games